William Crawford (born July 17, 1937) is a Canadian-born former American football offensive lineman who played in the National Football League (NFL).  Crawford played CIS football for the UBC Thunderbirds.  After graduation in 1960, he signed with the New York Giants.  He played four games for them and became one of the first U Sports players to play in the NFL.

References

External links
 NFL.com profile

1937 births
Living people
American football offensive linemen
Canadian players of American football
New York Giants players
UBC Thunderbirds football players
People from New Westminster
Canadian football offensive linemen